Kurt R. Erskine is an American attorney who served as the acting U.S. Attorney for the United States District Court for the Northern District of Georgia. He served in office from February 1, 2021 to May 2, 2022.

Background 
Erskine earned a Bachelor of Arts in public policy from the College of William & Mary, a Masters of Health Services Administration from the University of Kansas School of Allied Health, and a Juris Doctor from the University of Kansas School of Law. Erskine served as the First Assistant United States Attorney and chief of the public corruption division of the United States Attorney's office for the Northern District of Georgia.

References 

Living people
United States Attorneys for the Northern District of Georgia
College of William & Mary alumni
University of Kansas alumni
University of Kansas School of Law alumni
Georgia (U.S. state) lawyers
Year of birth missing (living people)